Värvat Främlingsregemente (Enlisted Foreigner Regiment), was a Swedish Army infantry regiment organised in Poland in the early 18th century.

History 
The regiment was organised in Poland in 1706 during the Great Northern War, and it was made up of 1,200 men—mostly former Polish soldiers that had been captured or that had deserted. In 1709 when the regiment marched out of Poland, 960 men deserted, and the regiment was disbanded. The remaining soldiers were transferred to other regiments.

Campaigns 
The Great Northern War (1700–1721)

Name, designation and garrison

See also 
List of Swedish regiments
Provinces of Sweden

References 
Print

Online

Infantry regiments of Sweden